Marina Solopova (born 13 February 1990) is a Lithuanian female professional basketball player.

References

External links
Profile at eurobasket.com

1990 births
Living people
Lithuanian women's basketball players
People from Klaipėda
Shooting guards